Chetan Anand may refer to:

Chetan Anand (badminton) (born 1980), Indian badminton player
Chetan Anand (director) (1921–1997), Bollywood personality